Walter Martinez (born 26 March 1991) is a Honduran professional footballer who plays for Motagua in the Liga Nacional de Honduras.

On 28 May 2018 Martinez made his senior debut for the Honduras national football team against South Korea.

References

1991 births
Living people
Honduran footballers
Liga Nacional de Fútbol Profesional de Honduras players
Honduran Liga Nacional de Ascenso players
C.D. Necaxa players
Real C.D. España players
C.D.S. Vida players
C.D. Marathón players
F.C. Motagua players
Sportspeople from Tegucigalpa
Association football midfielders
2021 CONCACAF Gold Cup players